The fourth Tour of Flanders for Women, a women's road cycling race in Belgium, was held on 8 April 2007. British rider Nicole Cooke won the race in a two-woman sprint with Russian Zoulfia Zabirova. Marianne Vos finished third.

It was the second event of the 2007 UCI Women's Road World Cup.

Race summary
164 riders started the race in Oudenaarde. The early tempo was high as pre-race favourite Nicole Cooke put her Raleigh-Lifeforce team to work. Nicole Cooke bridged the gap to Thürig on the Muur, at 16 km from the finish before breaking clear on the final climb, the Bosberg, but was caught by the chasing group shortly after. Thürig attacked from the six-strong lead group, but was caught again. As Thürig was caught, Cooke launched the decisive attack, which only Zoulfia Zabirova could follow. Cooke easily beat Zabirova in the sprint; Dutch rider Marianne Vos finished third at five seconds.

Result

References

External links

2007
Tour
2007 UCI Women's Road World Cup